Hua Mak railway station is a railway station located in Phatthanakan Subdistrict, Suan Luang, Bangkok. This station is an interchange station for the Airport Rail Link, at Hua Mak station.

Train services 
 Ordinary train No. 275/276 Bangkok–Aranyaprathet–Bangkok
 Ordinary train No. 277/278 Bangkok–Kabin Buri–Bangkok
 Ordinary train No. 279/280 Bangkok–Aranyaprathet–Bangkok
 Ordinary train No. 281/282 Bangkok–Kabin Buri–Bangkok
 Ordinary train No. 283/284 Bangkok–Ban Phlu Ta Luang–Bangkok
 Ordinary train No. 285/286 Bangkok–Chachoengsao Junction–Bangkok
 Ordinary train No. 367/368 Bangkok–Chachoengsao Junction–Bangkok
 Ordinary train No. 371/372 Bangkok–Prachin Buri–Bangkok
 Ordinary train No.376/378 Rangsit–Hua Takhe–Bangkok
 Ordinary train No. 379/380 Bangkok–Hua Takhe–Bangkok
 Ordinary train No. 381/382 Bangkok–Chachoengsao Junction–Bangkok
 Ordinary train No. 383/384 Bangkok–Chachoengsao Junction–Bangkok
 Ordinary train No. 385/388 Bangkok–Chachoengsao Junction–Bangkok
 Ordinary train No. 389/390 Bangkok–Chachoengsao Junction–Bangkok
 Ordinary train No. 391/394 Bangkok–Chachoengsao Junction–Bangkok

Notes 
 No. 283/284, 383/384, 376/378, 379/380 runs on weekdays only
 No. 285/286 runs on weekends only
 No. 385/386 runs on national working days only.
 No. 381 runs every one day before the end of a national holiday only.
 No. 394 runs every one day before the start of a national holiday only.

Around the station

Transportation 
 Airport Rail Link station
 SRT Light Red Line
 Bus stop

Places 
 Italian Thai Co Ltd
 Hua Mak Kitchen
 Panda Speed
 O-Bento Japanese Delivery

References 
 
 

Railway stations in Bangkok